The Tapaswini Express is daily Express train between Hatia and Puri. The train was the first Express train to be introduced with a route via Bhubaneswar, Dhenkanal, Talcher, Sambalpur. 18451UP departs Hatia at 15:55 and reaches Puri at 07:15 every day. The 18452DN departs Puri at 20:00 and reaches Hatia at 11:05 every day. This train has two rakes with WAP-4 or WAP-7 Visakhapatnam locomotive. This train reverses 2 times: at Sambalpur and Talcher.

This train is named after famous Odia book Tapaswini written by 19th century Odia poet Swabhabkabi Gangadhar Meher.

Route 
 PURI  – Puri	  			
 KUR  – Khurda Road Junction	  		
 BBS  – Bhubaneswar	  		
 CTC  – Cuttack Junction
 DNKL – Dhenkanal
 TLHR – Talcher (train reverses direction)

 ANGL – Angul
 BONA – Boinda
 RAIR – Rairakhol

 SBP  – Sambalpur Junction (train reverses direction)
 RGL  – Rengali
 JSG  – Jharsuguda Junction

 BMB  – Bamra

 GP   – Rajgangpur
 ROU  – Rourkela Junction

 ORGA – Orga
 BANO – Bano

 GBX  – Govindpur Road
 HTE  – Hatia

Schedule

Coach composition
The train has standard LHB rakes with max speed of 130 kmph.

 1 AC I Tier 
 3 AC II Tier
 4 AC III Tier
 11 Sleeper coaches
 4 General
 2 Second-class Luggage/parcel van

Reversals
TLHR – Talcher railway station
SBP  –

Loco
As this route is fully electrified, this train runs with electric locomotive WAP-7 or WAP-4 of Visakhapatnam shed end to end

Diesel Loco Shed, Bondamunda WDM-3D/Twins was used earlier (before electrification of Jharsuguda/Sambalpur to Talcher route).

See also

Bokaro Steel City–Bhubaneswar Garib Rath Express
List of named passenger trains in India
Express trains in India
Indian Railways coaching stock
Hatia railway station
Puri railway station
Talcher Road railway station

References

External links
India Rail Info page

Transport in Ranchi
Transport in Puri
Named passenger trains of India
Rail transport in Odisha
Rail transport in Jharkhand
Express trains in India